Ford Island is an island in the middle of Pearl Harbor, Hawaii.

Ford Island may also refer to:
 Ford Island (Windmill Islands), a small rocky island off the eastern coast of Antarctica
 Ford Island or Powers Island, an island of the Midwest in Michigan